Limnaecia lubricata is a moth in the family Cosmopterigidae. It is found in Sri Lanka.

References

Natural History Museum Lepidoptera generic names catalog

Limnaecia
Taxa named by Edward Meyrick
Moths described in 1917
Moths of Sri Lanka